The China Institute of Atomic Energy or CIAE, formerly the Institute of Atomic Energy of the Chinese Academy of Sciences, is the main research institute of the China National Nuclear Corporation (CNNC).
Founded in 1950, it conducts research in the fields of nuclear physics, nuclear engineering, radiochemistry, and in the development of nuclear technology.

See also
Nuclear power in China

References

Nuclear technology in China
Nuclear research institutes
Military research of China
1950 establishments in China